Frederick Francis John Greenfield (10 May 1850 – 25 October 1900) was an English cricketer and Anglican priest.

Greenfield was born in Gorakhpur, Bengal (now in Uttar Pradesh), and was educated at Hurstpierpoint and Peterhouse, Cambridge. He played cricket for Sussex and was twice club captain in the periods 1876 to 1878 and 1881 to 1882. He also played for Cambridge University from 1874 to 1876 and was captain in 1876. He appeared in 85 first-class matches from 1873 to 1884 as a right-handed batsman who bowled right arm slow with a roundarm action. He scored 2,549 runs with a highest score of 126 and took 111 wickets with a best performance of seven for 26.

Greenfield was ordained as a Church of England priest in 1879 and after various curacies was chaplain of the Poor Law Union in the district of Cuckfield, West Sussex, from 1884 to 1891, and also of the Sussex county lunatic asylum from 1885 to 1890. He then moved to South Africa and was headmaster of a school near Dundee, Natal, from 1896 until 1900 when, during the Second Boer War, he was taken prisoner by the Boers, was robbed of everything and died of pleurisy.

References

 
1850 births
1900 deaths
English cricketers
Sussex cricketers
Sussex cricket captains
Cambridge University cricketers
Marylebone Cricket Club cricketers
Gentlemen of England cricketers
People educated at Hurstpierpoint College
Alumni of Peterhouse, Cambridge
19th-century English Anglican priests
Second Boer War prisoners of war
Second Boer War casualties
Deaths from pleurisy